Fred Carl may refer to:
 Fred Carl (baseball) (1858–1899), baseball player
 Fred Carl (politician), Montana State Senator